St. David is a census-designated place (CDP) in Cochise County, Arizona, United States. The population was 1,699 at the 2010 census.

History
St. David was established as a result of the Mormon Battalion having earlier passed through the San Pedro River valley in 1846. One of the founders of St. David, Philemon C. Merrill, was a member of the battalion. The Mormon settlers of 1877 were part of a group that originally was to settle Lehi, Arizona. The town was named after David Patten Kimball. The early St. David settlers played an important role in establishing the subsequent surrounding settlements, such as Fort Huachuca and Tombstone, as they did much of the logging in the Huachuca Mountains to provide lumber for the construction of those locations.

As a tight-knit Mormon community, St. David managed better than other small towns in Cochise County during the Great Depression.

An influx of non-Mormons, principally from Oklahoma and Texas, took place when St. David became the site for Civilian Conservation Corps Camp SCS-19-A from 1935 to 1940. Works included soil erosion and flood control projects.

The first natural gas lines brought into Cochise County were brought into St. David.

Geography
St. David is located at  (31.898039, -110.218034).

The portion of Arizona State Route 80 that runs east-west through town uses the earlier Patten Street alignment, with the center of town located at the intersection of Patten and Miller Lane.

The main crossings of the San Pedro River in St. David are at Dragoon Wash to the north west and Escalante Crossing to the south. The latter was known as upper crossing and was the site of a stagecoach station.

Climate
St. David has a semi-arid climate (Köppen: BSk) with cool winters, hot summers, and large diurnal temperature variation throughout the year.

Demographics

As of the census of 2000, there were 1,744 people, 666 households, and 462 families residing in the CDP. The racial makeup of the CDP was 93.0% White, 0.4% Black or African American, 0.3% Native American, 0.5% Asian, 0.2% Pacific Islander, 3.0% from other races, and 2.6% from two or more races.  9.8% of the population were Hispanic or Latino of any race.

There were 666 households, out of which 28.1% had children under the age of 18 living with them, 59.3% were married couples living together, 8.1% had a female householder with no husband present, and 30.5% were non-families. 26.9% of all households were made up of individuals, and 17.0% had someone living alone who was 65 years of age or older.  The average household size was 2.60 and the average family size was 3.16.

In the CDP, the age distribution of the population shows 28.3% under the age of 18, 5.4% from 18 to 24, 18.2% from 25 to 44, 23.3% from 45 to 64, and 24.8% who were 65 years of age or older.  The median age was 44 years. For every 100 females, there were 96.4 males.  For every 100 females age 18 and over, there were 98.6 males.

The median income for a household in the CDP was $30,840, and the median income for a family was $32,292. Males had a median income of $31,641 versus $21,339 for females. The per capita income for the CDP was $12,872.  About 8.7% of families and 12.1% of the population were below the poverty line, including 13.6% of those under age 18 and 3.8% of those age 65 or over.

Education
In 1878 a one-room schoolhouse was built from stone, but it was destroyed in the 1887 Sonora earthquake. The 500-pound bell from that schoolhouse is now on display at the current school. In 1938 a brick school house was built, it still stands today and is on the National Register of Historic Places. It is one of the oldest standing structures in the area. The St. David School District is also the oldest in the San Pedro Valley. The annual San Pedro Valley Fair has been held at the St. David High School since 1934. In 2008 St. David held a celebration its 130 anniversary during the 75th San Pedro Valley Fair with a Town Reunion at the St. David School. Another popular cultural event held at the school is the annual 1880s Historic Costume Ball, which is patterned after a typical postbellum Indian War-era military ball.

Transportation
Benson Area Transit provides transportation to Benson two days a week.

Notable people
 David Patten Kimball

See also
 The Church of Jesus Christ of Latter-day Saints in Arizona

References

External links
 St. David Unified School District

Census-designated places in Cochise County, Arizona
Civilian Conservation Corps in Arizona
Populated places in the San Pedro Valley (Arizona)
1877 establishments in Arizona Territory
Populated places established in 1877